Small Time is a 2014 American comedy film written and directed by Joel Surnow. It stars Christopher Meloni, Devon Bostick, Dean Norris, Bridget Moynahan, Xander Berkeley and Ashley Jensen. It was released on April 18, 2014 by Anchor Bay Entertainment.

Cast

Christopher Meloni as Al Klein
Dean Norris as Ash Martini
Devon Bostick as Freddy
Bridget Moynahan as Barbara
Xander Berkeley as Chick
Ashley Jensen as Gail
Garcelle Beauvais as Linda
Amaury Nolasco as Barlow
Ken Davitian as Wexler
Gregory Itzin as Lennie
Kevin Nealon as Irv

References

External links
 

2014 films
2014 comedy films
American comedy films
Films scored by Sean Callery
2010s English-language films
2010s American films